This is a list of people from Rochdale, in Greater Manchester. The demonym of Rochdale is Rochdalian, however, this list may include people from Heywood, Littleborough, Middleton, Milnrow and Wardle, all from the wider Metropolitan Borough of Rochdale. This list is arranged alphabetically by surname:



B

Colin Baker – actor known for playing Doctor Who on television
Samuel Bamford – radical and writer; born in Middleton
Lizzy Bardsley – gained fame from appearing on Channel 4's Wife Swap in 2003
Les Barton – English professional footballer
Stuart Bithell – Olympic Silver Medallist – Men's 470 sailing at the London 2012 summer Olympics and Olympic Gold Medalist - Men's 49er sailing at the Tokyo 2020 summer Olympics
Christine Bottomley – actress known for her roles on Early Doors, Heartbeat and as Shoo Coggan on BBC drama, Hope Springs
Steve Brackenridge – football player
John Bright – radical; Liberal statesman associated with Richard Cobden in the formation of the Anti-Corn Law League

C
Robert Chadwick – American politician; Pennsylvania State Representative for Delaware County from 1881 to 1888
Steve Clayton – Rochdale-born author and drummer in Tractor; co-founder with Chris Hewitt and Jim Milne of Tractor Sound Studios, marked in Heywood by a blue plaque; his albums under the name Tractor and his book under the name Stephen Clayton received critical acclaim
Brian Clegg – science writer; born in Rochdale
John Collier – Urmston-born 18th-century caricaturist and satirical poet; brought up and spent all his adult life in Milnrow
Jake Cody – professional poker player, winner of the triple crown
Steve Coogan – Middleton-born and brought up comedian
Jack Crabtree – contemporary artist; born in Rochdale
Lisa Cross – IFBB professional bodybuilder

D

Craig Dawson – professional footballer, Rochdale, West Bromwich Albion, Bolton Wanderers, Watford and England U21

E

Kelvin Earl – Littleborough born rugby league footballer of the 1970s. He played at club level for Rochdale Hornets (two spells), St. Helens, Bradford Northern, and Swinton 
G. H. Elliott – music hall singer and recording star
Don Estelle – Crumpsall-born actor and singer who lived for much of his life in Rochdale

F

Roger Fenton – Heywood-born pioneering war photographer; his work on the Crimean War is particularly acclaimed; a blue plaque marks his former home
Gracie Fields – real name Grace Stansfield; actress, singer and comedian
Darrell Fitton – electronic musician from Rochdale, England. Most of his work is recorded under recording monikers Bola and Jello, 
Paul Flowers – banker, also known as the Crystal Methodist; councillor in the town in 1988–92
Anna Friel – stage and screen actress

G
Alfred Henry Gill (1856–1914) – MP for Bolton, 1906–1914. In first group of 29 Labour MPs to enter Parliament.
Julie Goodyear – television actress and personality, best known for her portrayal of Bet Lynch in Coronation Street

H
Trevor Hoyle – novelist, radio dramatist, broadcaster whose literary work is set in the northwest

J
Anna Jacobs – novelist
Barb Jungr – singer, songwriter and musician
Sajid Javid – Politician and former Home Secretary for the Conservative Government

K

Sir James Kay-Shuttleworth, 1st Baronet –  politician and educationalist
Andy Kershaw – BBC music broadcaster
Liz Kershaw – BBC music broadcaster
Walter Kershaw – artist
Heather Knight - cricketer

L

Donald Love – professional footballer
Jessica Lord - actress

M

Bob Mason – actor
Joseph Massey – cricketer
Dwight McNeil – footballer, first teenager to score a Premier League goal for Burnley F.C.
Vance Miller – controversial entrepreneur from Rochdale
Jim Milne – lead guitarist and vocalist in Tractor and co founder of Tractor Sound Studios – see John Peel blue plaque in Heywood
John Milne – Liverpool-born, Milnrow-brought up professor, geologist and mining engineer who invented a pioneering seismograph (known as the Milne-Shaw seismograph) to detect and measure earthquakes

O

Bill Oddie – naturalist, comedian, musician and actor

R

Francis Robert Raines – former Anglican vicar of Milnrow; antiquary; edited 23 volumes for the Chetham Society publications
Alec Roth – composer

S
Joseph A. Sladen, recipient of the Medal of Honor during the American Civil War, born in Rochdale
Joseph Smith (born 1849) – steeplejack known as "the Best Steeplejack in the World"; born in Coventry
Cyril Smith (1928-2010) - Member of Parliament
Lisa Stansfield – Grammy Award-nominated and BRIT Award-winning R&B and soul singer; brought up in Heywood

W
Keira Walsh, footballer.

See also 
List of people from Greater Manchester

References

Notes

Bibliography

 
Rochdale
Rochdale